Periploca juniperi is a moth in the family Cosmopterigidae. It was described by Ronald W. Hodges in 1978. It is found in North America, where it has been recorded from Wyoming and California.

Adults have been recorded on wing from June to August and in December.

The larvae feed within Gymnosporangium-galls on Juniperus species.

References

Moths described in 1978
Chrysopeleiinae
Taxa named by Ronald W. Hodges
Moths of North America